A cèilidh or céilí is a traditional Scottish or Irish social gathering. In its most basic form, it simply means a social visit. In contemporary usage, it usually involves dancing and playing Gaelic folk music, either at a house party or a larger concert at a social hall or other community gathering place.

Cèilidhean (plural of cèilidh) and céilithe (plural of céilí) originated in the Gaelic areas of Scotland and Ireland and are consequently common in the Scottish and Irish diasporas. They are similar to the Troyl traditions in Cornwall and Twmpath and Noson Lawen events in Wales, as well as English country dances throughout England which have in some areas undergone a fusion with céilithe.

Etymology
The term is derived from the Old Irish céle (singular) meaning "companion". It later became céilidhe and céilidh, which means "visit" in Gaelic. In Scottish Gaelic reformed spelling it is spelled  cèilidh (plural cèilidhean) and in Irish reformed spelling as céilí (plural céilithe).

History
Originally, a ceilidh was a social gathering of any sort, and did not necessarily involve dancing.

In more recent decades, the dancing portion of the event has usurped the older meanings of the term, though the tradition of guests performing music, song, story telling and poetry still persists in some areas.

Ceilidhs were originally hosted by a fear-an-tigh, meaning "man of the house". This is still the form in Ireland, though otherwise in modern ceilidhs the host is usually referred to more simply as "Host" or "Master of Ceremonies".

Modern cèilidhs

Cèilidhs facilitated courting and prospects of marriage for young people and, although discos and nightclubs have displaced cèilidhs to a considerable extent, they are still an important and popular social outlet in rural parts of Ireland and Scotland, especially in the Gaelic-speaking regions. Cèilidhs are sometimes held on a smaller scale in private or public houses, for example in remote rural areas and during busy festivals.

It is common for some clubs and institutions such as sports clubs, schools and universities and even employers to arrange cèilidhs on a regular or at least annual basis. The formality of these can vary. Some mix modern pop music with a Scottish country dancing band and dress codes range from compulsory highland dress to informal. Knowledge and use of the basic dance steps is not always strictly necessary, and dances often alternate with songs, poetry recitals, story telling and other types of "party pieces".

Cèilidh music may be provided by an assortment of instruments including fiddle, flute, tin whistle, accordion, bodhrán, hammered dulcimer and in more recent times also drums, guitar, mandolin, bouzouki, Scottish smallpipes and electric bass guitar. The music is cheerful and lively, consisting in Ireland mainly of jigs, reels, hornpipes, polkas, slip-jigs and waltzes, with Scotland adding strathspeys, and England adding regional forms such as the northeastern rant. The basic steps can be learned easily; a short instructional session is often provided for new dancers before the start of the dance itself. In Ireland the first cèilidh band was put together in 1926 by Séamus Clandillon, Radio Éireann's director of Music, to have dance music for his studio-based programmes.

Dancing at cèilidhs is usually in the form of cèilidh dances, set dances or couple dances. A "set" consists of four to eight couples, with each pair of couples facing another in a square or rectangular formation. Each couple exchanges position with the facing couple, and also facing couples exchange partners, while all the time keeping in step with the beat of the music.

However, about half of the dances in the modern Scots cèilidh are couples' dances performed in a ring. These can be performed by fixed couples or in the more sociable "progressive" manner, with the lady moving to the next gentleman in the ring at or near the end of each repetition of the steps.  In Ireland, the similar style of dance is called cèili dance or fíor (true) cèili dance. Some of the dances are named after famous regiments, historical battles and events, others after items of daily rural life. The "Gay Gordons", "Siege of Ennis", "The Walls of Limerick" and "The Stack of Barley" are popular dances in this genre.

Step dancing is another form of dancing often performed at cèilidhs, the form that was popularised in the 1990s by the world-famous Riverdance ensemble. Whereas set dancing involves all present, whatever their skill, step dancing is usually reserved for show, being performed only by the most talented of dancers.

The cèilidh has been internationalised by the Scottish and Irish diasporas in Canada, the United States, Australia and New Zealand, where local cèilidhs and traditional music competitions are held. In recent years, cèilidh and traditional music competitions have been frequently won by descendants of emigrants.

It bears mention that cèilidhs are common throughout Nova Scotia. The tradition and the spirit of these gatherings are carried on in most small communities of these Maritime Provinces.

In Scotland

Privately organised cèilidhs are now extremely common in both rural and urban Scotland, where bands are hired, usually for evening entertainment for a wedding, birthday party, celebratory or fundraising event. These may be more or less formal, and very often omit all other traditional Gaelic activity beyond the actual music and dancing. Novices are usually among the participants, so a "dance caller" may teach the steps before music begins for each dance. The more versatile bands will demonstrate the dances too. Scottish primary schools frequently teach some "country dancing", often around Christmas time. Bands vary in size but are commonly made up of between 2 and 6 players. The appeal of the Scottish cèilidh is by no means limited to the younger generation, and dances vary in speed and complexity to accommodate most age groups and levels of ability. Most private schools in Scotland will also hold cèilidhs on a fairly regular basis.

Public cèilidhs are also held, attracting paying participants.

Universities in Scotland hold regular cèilidhs, with the University of Edinburgh providing a number for students throughout each term, especially the long-running Highland Annual, the oldest cèilidh in Edinburgh and the largest in Scotland, organised by the Highland Society ('An Comann Ceilteach'). Glasgow University Union's annual debating competition, Glasgow Ancients, traditionally ends the night with a cèilidh. The Union's Christmas event, Daft Friday also involves a cèilidh. Cèilidhs are common fundraising and social events for many societies at the University of Glasgow.

Some cèilidh bands intersperse cèilidh dancing with a DJ playing disco music to broaden the appeal of the evening's entertainment.

In Northern Ireland
The resurgence in the popularity of the céili (spelled this way in Ireland) over the last 20 years or so in Northern Ireland has been assisted in no small way by the interest in céilis amongst the younger generation and bands like Haste to the Wedding ceilidh band.

Similar gatherings in England
Ceilidh in England has evolved a little differently from its counterparts elsewhere in Britain and Ireland. English ceilidh, sometimes abbreviated to eCeilidh, can be considered part of English Country Dance (and related to Contra). English ceilidh has many things in common with the Scottish and Irish social dance traditions. The dance figures are similar using couples dances, square sets, long sets and circle dances. However, the English style requires a slower tempo of tune accentuating the on-beat, the central instrument often being the English melodeon, a diatonic accordion in the keys of D and G. Dancers often use a skip, a stephop or rant step depending on region. This contrasts with the smoother style and more fluid motion seen in Ireland, Scotland, or (the walking) in Contra. Many ceilidh dances involve a couple, but this does not limit the number of partners any one dancer has during the ceilidh. Often dancers will change partners every dance to meet new people.

An important part of English ceilidhs is the "caller" who instructs the dancer in the next dance. An experienced ceilidh caller will have a good understanding of the mechanics of the tunes and a deep knowledge of regional dances from the UK and beyond. They will confer with the band about what type of tune to play for the dance. This aids the selection of the right dance for the right audience. This skill is so sought after in the south of England that there are callers who are famous in their own right. However, many bands have their own caller, often also an instrumentalist; some have two.

During an English ceilidh there is often an interval involving the talents of local Morris or rapper side; this also serves to give bands with older members a rest.

It is possible to see many diverse and regionally distinct acts at a modern ceilidh. Acts range from the most traditional, like the Old Swan Band, to the most experimental like the electronic dance music influenced Monster Ceilidh Band. Many other forms of music have been combined with English ceilidh music including; Irish music from the band Phoenix Ceilidh Band; ska from the band Whapweasel; Traditional Jazz from the bands Chalktown and Florida; Funk Fusion from Licence to Ceilidh, Ceilidhography and Climax Ceilidh Band, Rock from the bands Peeping Tom, Aardvark Ceilidh Band, Touchstone and Tickled Pink; West African and Indian influenced music from the band Boka Halattraditional; traditional French music from the band Token Women; traditional Welsh music from Twm Twp; and heavy metal from Glorystrokes.

In popular culture 
 In the 1945 film I Know Where I'm Going! the characters attend a céilidh.
In the song Oh! What a Ceilidh, performed by Andy Stewart on his 1965 album Cambeltown Loch.  The song's composition is credited as:  (Grant-Stewart).
 In the 1983 film Local Hero the characters are shown at a céilidh.
 The 1987 song When New York Was Irish by Terence Winch mentions céilidhs.
 The 1990 film The Field features a céilidh.
 A song by the group Black 47 is titled "Funky Céilí" (1992).
 Danny Boyle's 1994 film Shallow Grave features Ewan McGregor and Kerry Fox at a céilidh.
 In the 1997 film Titanic the third class passengers hold a céilidh which Leonardo DiCaprio and Kate Winslet's characters attend.
 In the 1999 Michael Winterbottom Belfast-set movie With or Without You, London-Irish band Neck appear performing at a Céilidh that Christopher Eccleston & Dervla Kirwan's characters attend. Neck describe themselves as being a 'Psycho-Ceilídh' band - a term picked up by frontman Leeson O'Keeffe from Shane MacGowan when he was playing in his post-Pogues band, Shane MacGowan and The Popes. One of Neck's most popular tracks, an instrumental highlighting the band's musicianship on a set of Traditional Irish Jigs and Reels, is called "The Psycho-Ceilídh Mayhem set".
 In the 2000 – 2005 BBC TV series Monarch of the Glen the characters are shown at a céilidh.
  In 2002's The Magdalene Sisters a céilidh is portrayed.
 The characters in the 2003 film The Boys from County Clare participate in a céilidh band competition.
 In the 2006 film The Wind That Shakes The Barley, the characters are shown at a céilidh.
The popular Celtic musical team Celtic Woman describes a céilidh in their popular tour song "At The Céilí," a live recording of which appears on their 2007 album Celtic Woman: A New Journey.
Pogues frontman Shane MacGowan features the song "Céilidh Cowboy" on his The Crock of Gold album.
The Richard Thompson song "Johnny's Far Away" describes a couple who are unfaithful while the husband travels with a céilidh band.
 The band Real McKenzies song "Céilidh" from the album Clash of the Tartans (1998) describes the practice.
 The word "Ceili" in the name of the band Ceili Rain is explicitly meant to invoke the céilidh spirit.
 The Philadelphia Céilí Group is a music organisation known for its traditional Irish music and dance festivals.
 In the 2011 movie The Guard, the main character takes his dying mother to see a ceilidh band.
 In the British television series My Mother & Other Strangers, part of the Masterpiece series, there are multiple references to ceili and multiple scenes set at ceili in the fictional town of Moybeg.
Carnegie Mellon University holds an annual Céilidh which serves as the university's homecoming celebration.
 The lyrics of Ed Sheeran's song "Galway Girl" (2017) mention "dancing the Céilí, singing to trad tunes".

See also

References

Bibliography
John Cullinane: Aspects of the History of Irish Céilí Dancing, The Central Remedial Clinic, Clontarf, Dublin 3,(1998), 
An Coimisiún le Rincí Gaelacha: Ár Rincí Fóirne-Thirty Popular Céilí Dances, Westside Press (2003)
J. G. O' Keeffe, Art O' Brien: A Handbook of Irish Dances, 1. Edition, Gill & Son Ltd., (1902)
Helen Brennan: The Story of Irish Dance, Mount Eagle Publications Ltd., 1999

Further reading
The Sweets of May; Aoibhneas na Bealtaine: the céilí band era, music and dance of south Armagh. Ceol Camlocha (Tommy Fegan, chairman; book accompanied by 2 CDs and a DVD)

Irish folk music
Scottish folk music
European folk dances
Irish culture
Irish dance
Scottish country dance
Scottish society
Entertainment in Scotland
Celtic music festivals